Edmund Taylor may refer to:

Edmund Taylor of Oxton, England, who was instrumental in obtaining the Bidston Windmill
Edmund Taylor (cricketer) (1853–1936), English cricketer
Edmund Dick Taylor (1804–1891), US political figure and financial advisor
Edmund Haynes Taylor, Jr. (born 1832), historic US distiller after whom the Old Taylor and E. H. Taylor whiskey brands are named
Edmund Taylor (New Zealand politician) (1855–1927), New Zealand political figure
Edmund L. Taylor (1860–1934), Canadian political figure
Edmund Seyfang Taylor (1853–1908), early pioneer of rambling in the UK
Edmund B. Taylor (1904–1973), U.S. Navy admiral